Dumontiaceae is a red alga family in the order Gigartinales.

Species in the British Isles, includes Dumontia contorta (S.G.Gmelin) Ruprecht.

Genera
According to WoRMS;

 Andersoniella 
 Constantinea 
 Cryptosiphonia 
 Dasyphloea 
 Dilsea 
 Dudresnaya 
 Dumontia 
 Farlowia 
 Gibsmithia 
 Hyalosiphonia 
 Kraftia 
 Leptocladia 
 Masudaphycus 
 Neodilsea 
 Orculifilum 
 Pikea 
 Rhodopeltis 
 Thuretellopsis 
 Waernia 
 Weeksia 

Also;
 Former genus Borrichius  now accepted as synonym of Dudresnaya 
 Former genus Litharthron , now accepted as synonym of Rhodopeltis

References

External links 

 
Red algae families